The City of Vancouver held a municipal election on November 19, 2011, along with other municipalities and regional districts in British Columbia. All local government elections were for a three-year period. The ballot elected one mayor, 10 councillors, nine school board trustees and seven park board commissioners. A $180 million capital borrowing plan was also put to a vote.

Incumbent mayor Gregor Robertson and the Vision Vancouver Party sought and won their second term in office following their victory in the 2008 election. All Vision Vancouver candidates won seats in their respective categories.

Suzanne Anton lost her bid as mayor but the NPA team gained seats in council, park board and school board. COPE was nearly wiped out this election, losing both seats in city council. Its only elected official was school board trustee incumbent Allan Wong. On December 8, 2013, Wong resigned from the Coalition of Progressive Electors (COPE) and joined Vision as a sitting trustee.

The Green Party of Vancouver had its first elected city councillor with Adriane Carr, but lost its incumbent seat on the park board. New party Neighbourhoods for a Sustainable Vancouver (NSV) did not win any seats in council. NSV leader Randy Helten placed a distant third in the mayoral race.

Candidates and results
The nomination period officially opened on October 4, 2011, and closed on October 14, 2011. This was the second election where Vision Vancouver and COPE signed an electoral agreement to support each other's candidates for election.

(I) denotes incumbents.

Mayor

Twelve candidates sought election to the position of mayor. Four were affiliated with a political party and eight were independents. Incumbent mayor Gregor Robertson of Vision Vancouver was re-elected.

City councillors
Ten councillors were elected out of 41 candidates. Of the candidates, 28 were affiliated with a political party, and 13 were independent. Seven incumbent councillors sought re-election: six from Vision Vancouver and one from COPE. Of those subsequently elected, Vision Vancouver held seven seats, the NPA two and the Green Party of Vancouver one.

Park board commissioners
Seven commissioners were elected out of 21 candidates. Of the candidates, 15 were affiliated with a political party, and six were independent. Four incumbent commissioners sought re-election: three from Vision Vancouver and one from the Green Party of Vancouver. Of the elected commissioners, Vision held five seats and the NPA two.

School board trustees
Nine school board trustees were elected out of 20 candidates. Of the candidates, 15 were affiliated with a political party, and five were independent. Seven incumbent trustees were seeking re-election: three from Vision Vancouver, three from COPE, and one from the NPA. Of the elected trustees, five were from Vision Vancouver, three from the NPA and one from COPE.

Capital Plan questions

1. Are you in favour of council having the authority, without further assent of the electors, to pass by-laws between January 1, 2012, and December 31, 2014, to borrow an aggregate $65,800,000 for the following purposes? 
Community Facilities at $58,600,000
Parks at $7,200,000

2. Are you in favour of council having the authority, without further assent of the electors, to pass by-laws between January 1, 2012, and December 31, 2014, to borrow an aggregate $66,300,000 for the following purposes?
Street and Bridge Infrastructure at $41,150,000
Transit and Safety Improvements at $8,500,000
Street Lighting, Traffic Signals and Communications Systems at $16,650,000

3. Are you in favour of council having the authority, without further assent of the electors, to pass by-laws between January 1, 2012, and December 31, 2014, to borrow an aggregate $47,700,000 for the following purposes?
Public Safety Facilities at $13,200,000
Civic Facilities at $34,500,000

Voter and party statistics

Voter turnout
Of the 418,878 registered voters, there were 144,823 recorded ballots, marking the voter turnout at 34.57 percent.  This is an increase from the 30.79-percent turnout during the previous municipal election in 2008.

Elected percentage by party
Of the parties represented, only Vision Vancouver had its entire slate of candidates elected in all fields.

Seat changes by party

References

External links
 Vancouver Votes on city website

2011 elections in Canada
Municipal elections in Vancouver
2011 in British Columbia